Stenoma xanthophaeella is a moth in the family Depressariidae. It was described by Francis Walker in 1864. It is found in Amazonas, Brazil.

Adults are ochraceous, the forewings much rounded at the tips, with a large blackish patch extending from the outer part of the interior border nearly to the costa. The hindwings are blackish.

References

Moths described in 1864
Stenoma